Winer is a surname. Notable people with the surname include:

Ben J. Winer (1917–1984), American research psychologist
Dave Winer (born 1955), American software developer
Jason Winer (born 1972), American director, producer, writer
Matt Winer (born 1969), American television personality
Stephen Winer, American comedy writer
Szlama Ber Winer (1911–1942), a Polish Jew during the Holocaust

See also
15606 Winer, a main-belt asteroid, named after American physicist Irvin M. Winer (1935–1982) 
Wiener (disambiguation)